José Luis Perlaza Napa (born October 6, 1981) is an Ecuadoran former footballer who played as a centre back for C.D. Olmedo. He was named in the Ecuador national team for the 2006 FIFA World Cup.

Club career
Perlaza started his career at Sport Estudiantes when he was only 15. After Cinco de Agosto bought him, he was loaned out to Calvi F.C., Audaz Octubrino, and Olmedo.

Perlaza had a successful season with Olmedo. He managed to make a good first impression and they bought him for the next season. In Olmedo, Perlaza has played many important games in Copa Libertadores and the Ecuadorian Serie A. He soon became Olmedo's first choice center back due to his tremendous size and skill. Perlaza played 203 games and scored 2 goals total for Olmedo before being transferred out.

In April 2009, Perlaza went on trial for MLS club Toronto FC.

In May 2009, Perlaza joined Ecuadorian team, Barcelona.

International career
Perlaza was part of Ecuador's squad for the FIFA World Cup 2006. Perlaza scored his first goal for Ecuador in an unofficial friendly match against LDU Quito. Ecuador won, 5-0.

References

External links

1981 births
Living people
Sportspeople from Esmeraldas, Ecuador
Association football central defenders
Ecuadorian footballers
Ecuador international footballers
2006 FIFA World Cup players
C.D. Olmedo footballers
Barcelona S.C. footballers